This page shows the standings and results for Group E of the UEFA Euro 2012 qualifying tournament.

The Netherlands won the group, with Sweden finishing second and qualifying directly for the finals as the best runner-up.

Standings

Matches
Group E fixtures were negotiated between the participants at a meeting in Amsterdam, Netherlands on 17 February 2010.

Goalscorers

Discipline

References

Group E
2010 in Swedish football
2011 in Swedish football
Sweden at UEFA Euro 2012
2010–11 in San Marino football
2011–12 in San Marino football
2011–12 in Moldovan football
2010–11 in Moldovan football
2010–11 in Dutch football
Qual
2010–11 in Hungarian football
2011–12 in Hungarian football
2010 in Finnish football
2011 in Finnish football